Bring the Thunder is the debut album from Swedish rock band Dynazty.

Track listing
Music & lyrics by Dynazty.

 "Bring the Thunder"
 "Catch the Night"
 "Lights Out (In Candyland)"
 "Far Away"
 "Top of the Line"
 "Monkey Wants Monkey Needs"
 "Adrenaline"
 "Take Me Down"
 "The Devil's Shake"
 "Higher N' Higher"
 "Sail Away" (bonus track)

Personnel
Band
 Nils Molin – lead vocals
 Rob Love – guitar
 John Berg – guitar
 Joey Fox – bass guitar
 George Egg – drums

Production
 Produced, engineered, mixed and mastered by Chris Laney

References 

2009 debut albums
Dynazty albums